Alionematichthys is a genus of viviparous brotulas.

Species
There are currently 11 recognized species in this genus:
 Alionematichthys ceylonensis Møller & Schwarzhans, 2008
 Alionematichthys crassiceps Møller & Schwarzhans, 2008
 Alionematichthys minyomma (Sedor & Cohen, 1987)
 Alionematichthys phuketensis Møller & Schwarzhans, 2008
 Alionematichthys piger (Alcock, 1890)
 Alionematichthys plicatosurculus Møller & Schwarzhans, 2008
 Alionematichthys riukiuensis (Aoyagi, 1954) (Bigeye cusk)
 Alionematichthys samoaensis Møller & Schwarzhans, 2008
 Alionematichthys shinoharai Møller & Schwarzhans, 2008
 Alionematichthys suluensis Møller & Schwarzhans, 2008
 Alionematichthys winterbottomi Møller & Schwarzhans, 2008

References

Bythitidae